Monte Vista is a historic apartment complex located in the Overbrook neighborhood of Philadelphia, Pennsylvania. The complex consists of four, four-story stone buildings constructed in 1910, 1915, 1916, and 1921.

It was added to the National Register of Historic Places in 1983.

References

Residential buildings on the National Register of Historic Places in Philadelphia
Residential buildings completed in 1921
Overbrook, Philadelphia